Sample Road, mostly signed as State Road 834 (SR 834),  is a  east–west commuter highway serving northern Broward County, Florida.  It begins at an interchange with the Sawgrass Expressway in Coral Springs and ends at North Federal Highway (US 1) at the city limits boundary between Pompano Beach and Lighthouse Point. Eastbound travelers overshooting the SR 834 terminus find themselves on a  36th Street in Lighthouse Point, which dead-ends at a canal cut for the Intracoastal Waterway.

The westernmost  of Sample Road are designated, but not signed, as County Road 834.

Route description

Like most major east-west throughways in Coral Springs, SR 834 begins at the Sawgrass Expressway (SR 869). The road heads east  through primarily residential zones before its first major intersection with University Drive.

SR 834 forms an interchange with US 441 (SR 7) where the city limits of Coral Springs, Margate, and Coconut Creek intersect. After the interchange, SR 834 forms the border between Margate and Coconut Creek for  before completely entering Coconut Creek. The road then heads east, bisecting Tradewinds Park before its interchange with Florida's Turnpike.

After passing the Turnpike, SR 834 forms the northern border of Pompano Beach, and after intersecting Powerline Road, it also forms the southern border of Deerfield Beach. SR 834's next major intersection is with Interstate 95.

SR 834 has one more intersection with North Dixie Highway before the state road designation ends at its intersection with North Federal Highway. East of Federal Highway, the road continues east for about a mile before ending just before the Intracoastal Waterway.

History
Sample Road was for several years designated as S-834, part of the Florida secondary highway system.  In the 1980s, most secondary routes were given to the counties, but 834 was promoted to a primary route.  Subsequently, the designation of the former primary SR 834 in Dade County was reassigned to the State Road 948 designation.

Sample Road is also mentioned in the hidden track of Nothing Gold Can Stay (album) by Coral Springs natives New Found Glory.

Major intersections

References

External links
 

834
834
County roads in Broward County, Florida